Sot Chitalada, born as Chaovalit Wongcharoean (5 May 1962, in Chonburi, Thailand) was formerly twice WBC and Lineal Flyweight Champion, having defended the title against nine boxers in total.

Professional boxing career
Chitalada built a reputation as a Muay Thai fighter under the name Chaovalit Sitphraphrom before making the transition to professional boxing. He fought numerous times with Muay Thai legend Samart Payakaroon. After winning his first four professional fights, he challenged WBC Light flyweight Champion Jung-Koo Chang on 31 March 1984, losing a twelve-round decision.

His ring name "Sot Chitalada" comes from the name of "Muns Sorchitpatana", another boxer under the same manager. But Sorchitpatana losing by the former WBC Light flyweight Champion Netrnoi Sor Vorasingh and likely to retire. But the name Sorchitpatana also in the ranking of the WBC, his manager was a subrogate Chaovalit Sitphraphrom to fight on behalf instead Muns Sorchitpatana. Later the rankings of the WBC was incorrect,  Sorchitpatana became to Sot Chitlada eventually.

World Flyweight Championship
Undaunted by the Chang loss, he won two more fights and a little over six months later shocked WBC and Lineal Flyweight Champion Gabriel Bernal, winning the world championships in his home country at Indoor Stadium Huamark, Bangkok.

Chitalada is perhaps best-remembered for his fights with Bernal.  The two met again twice in Bangkok. On 22 June 1985, Bernal fought Chitalada to a twelve-round draw, Chitalada keeping the titles.  Bernal made another attempt eighteen months later, but on 10 December 1986 he lost another twelve-round decision to Chitalada. This was Bernal's final attempt at the Flyweight titles.

Chitalada brought stability to the WBC and Lineal Flyweight titles, the six title holders prior to Bernal all losing the belts in their first defences, and Bernal losing his second defence.  Following the first Bernal fight, Chitalada made six title defences (and won several non-title fights).  During this run he defeated former world champions Charlie Magri and Freddy Castillo.  He lost the titles on 24 July 1988, travelling to South Korea and losing a twelve-round decision to unbeaten (at that time) Yong-Kang Kim.

After winning three more fights, Chitalada lured Kim for a rematch in his home country of Thailand. This time, it was Chitalada who came out on top, winning a twelve-round decision.  Chitalada made four more title defences after he regained the titles.  In his third defence, he made his second fight in the Western Hemisphere, defeating Richard Clarke by an eleventh-round knockout in Kingston, Jamaica, thus retaining his titles.  For his fourth defence, he travelled to Seoul to avenge the only other loss in his career, to Jung-Koo Chang.  Following the Chang fight, on 15 February 1991 Chitalada defended his titles against fellow-countryman Muangchai Kittikasem.  This fight ended Chitalada's reign as he suffered his first knockout, Kittikasem stopping him in Round 6 to take the titles.  Chitalada won two more fights before challenging Kittikasem to a rematch, but the result was the same, this time it ended in a ninth-round stoppage.  That fight would be the last of Chitalada's career, he retired and never attempted a comeback.

Chitalada is a Thai Muslim. After retirement, he studied at the Faculty of Humanities, University of the Thai Chamber of Commerce. He is the first Thai boxer who graduated a bachelor's degree. He worked in the Public Relations Department of the Thai Airways already resigned.

From 2006 to 2007, Chitalada taught Muay Thai at the Muay Thai Institute of Kunponli in Salt Lake City, Utah. He has since moved to teach martial arts in California and in Utah.

While being in Utah he would visit the Thai Temple that was located in Layton, Utah. He was honored as many people would come to him for autographs. He spoke broken English but was very eager to teach his Muay Thai class in the early mornings at 6:00 a.m.. His style was different from the other teachers that were there. He definitely brought the world of Thailand to little Utah. One move that he was recognized for was the Jumping Air Kick. Most of his former Utah students miss him and wish him best of luck in his new location of training.

Professional boxing record

Muay Thai record

|-  style="background:#cfc;"
| 1983-09-28|| Win||align=left| Phayanoi Sor Tassanee || Rajadamnern Stadium || Bangkok, Thailand || Decision|| 5||3:00 

|-  style="background:#fbb;"
| 1983-08-24|| Loss||align=left| Langkrung Kiatkriangkrai || Rajadamnern Stadium || Bangkok, Thailand ||Decision || 5||3:00
|-
! style=background:white colspan=9 | 

|-  style="background:#cfc;"
| 1983-06-17|| Win ||align=left| Rungchai Thairungruang || Rajadamnern Stadium || Bangkok, Thailand || Decision|| 5||3:00 

|-  style="background:#fbb;"
| 1983-05-12|| Loss||align=left| Langkrung Kiatkriangkrai || Rajadamnern Stadium || Bangkok, Thailand ||Decision || 5||3:00
|-
! style=background:white colspan=9 | 

|-  style="background:#cfc;"
| 1982-10-|| Win ||align=left| Palannoi Kiatanan|| Rajadamnern Stadium || Bangkok, Thailand || Decision|| 5||3:00 

|-  style="background:#FFBBBB;"
| 1979-09-02|| Loss||align=left| Samart Payakaroon || Lumpinee Stadium || Bangkok, Thailand ||Decision || 5 || 3:00

|-  style="background:#;"
| 1979-07-24|| ||align=left| Wisanupon Saksamut || Lumpinee Stadium || Bangkok, Thailand |||| || 

|-  style="background:#fbb;"
| 1979-01-01|| Loss||align=left| Samart Payakaroon ||  || Sa Kaeo Province, Thailand ||Decision || 5 || 3:00
|-
| colspan=9 | Legend:

References

External links

 Sot Chitalada - CBZ Profile

|-

|-

Muay Thai trainers
1962 births
Living people
Flyweight boxers
World boxing champions
World flyweight boxing champions
World Boxing Council champions
Sot Chitalada
Sot Chitalada
Sot Chitalada